Bahrudin Čengić (7 January 1931 – 16 October 2007), sometimes credited as Bato Čengić, was a Bosnian screenwriter and film director who was active in Yugoslavia.

Biography
Čengić was born in 1931, although some sources give 7 January 1933 as the date of birth.

During the war in Bosnia and Herzegovina, Čengić filmed over 1,000 minutes of the Siege of Sarajevo, which he converted in a documentary "essay" called Sarajevo.

He appeared in the 2007 documentary Zabranjeni bez zabrane. Čengić died in Sarajevo on 16 October 2007, aged 76.

Filmography

Films

Documentaries

Television

Short films

References

External links

1931 births
2007 deaths
People from Maglaj
Bosniaks of Bosnia and Herzegovina
Bosnia and Herzegovina Muslims
Yugoslav film directors
Bosnia and Herzegovina film directors
Bosnia and Herzegovina screenwriters
Male screenwriters
20th-century screenwriters
Bosnia and Herzegovina male writers